Anand Kumar Singh (8 August 19484 December 2020) was a Fijian lawyer and politician of Indian descent. He was born in Bombay, when his family had temporarily moved to India. The family returned from India in 1951 to live at the birthplace of his father, Parmanand Singh, in Yalalevu, Ba. His father was one of the first three Indo-Fijians to be elected to the Legislative Council of Fiji.

A member of the Fiji Labour Party, he was elected to represent the Lautoka Rural Indian Communal Constituency in the House of Representatives, and was appointed Attorney-General in the government of Prime Minister Mahendra Chaudhry, serving until the government was deposed in the Fiji coup of 2000.

On 19 May 2000, he was among the 43 members of the People's Coalition Government, led by Mahendra Chaudhry, taken hostage by George Speight and his band of rebel Republic of Fiji Military Forces (RFMF) soldiers from the Counter Revolutionary Warfare Unit. He was released on 12 July 2000.

From 2001 to 2006, he served as one of 8 Senators nominated by the Leader of the Opposition.

Singh practiced law privately, and was the senior partner of the Chaudhry and Singh law firm, which includes Rajendra Chaudhry, Mahendra Chaudhry's son.

Personal life 

Singh had two children, Hamish and Nikish, from a previous marriage. Their mother and sister died in an aeroplane accident in 1999. He had two children, Manish and Pranish from a second marriage.

References 

1948 births
2020 deaths
Fijian Hindus
Attorneys-general of Fiji
Indian members of the House of Representatives (Fiji)
Indian members of the Senate (Fiji)
Fiji Labour Party politicians
20th-century Fijian lawyers
Indian emigrants to Fiji
Politicians from Lautoka
Politicians from Mumbai
Fijian politicians of Indian descent
21st-century Fijian lawyers